Messe München GmbH is the operator of the Neue Messe München exhibition center, the ICM Internationales Congress Center München and the MOC Veranstaltungscenter München. The exhibition space of the 16 halls together is 180,000 m2 and another 425,000 m2 of outdoor area, making Messe München by far the holder of the largest outdoor area of all exhibition companies in Germany. Messe München organizes some 40 trade fairs for capital and consumer goods and key high-tech-industries in Munich and abroad.

Overview
Partners of Messe München are the Free State of Bavaria and the City of Munich. Chairman of the Board since January 2010 is Klaus Dittrich. In the exhibition area there are exhibition rooms, the exhibition hall, exhibition tower and the International Congress Centre Munich (ICM). The architects were Bystrup Architecture Design Engineering, Bregenhøj + Partners, Kaup, Scholz, Jesse + Partner.

Messe München is a member of the AUMA, FKM, GDG, UFI, and CEFA trade associations.

After moving the fair from the city center to the former airport site in Messestadt Riem allowing the exhibition companies, along with the Neue Messe Munich, to have one of the most modern and sustainable trade fair complexes in the world and it has been certified as an energy-efficient company by TÜV Süd. With one of the largest Photovoltaic roof systems in the world and a sophisticated energy concept to an annual saving of more than 8,000 tons of CO2. The entire exhibition center is heated with renewable energy through a geothermal system from Stadtwerke München.

The Messe München trade-fair center, the ICM Internationales Congress Center München and the MOC Veranstaltungscenter München are available for conferences, meetings and small events.

In 2015, Messe München GmbH recorded a turnover of €230,2 million, Messe München Group of €277.4 million. 8,974 of a total of 33,772 exhibitors came from abroad. In 2015 Messe München saw a total of 1,942,259 visitors.

In August 2020, the company announced that they lost €170 million due to Covid-19.

Events 
The most visited event at the Munich Trade Fair Center is the construction fair bauma, also the world's geographically largest fair, which takes place every three years and attracted some 580,000 visitors in 2016. Large public exhibitions are the f.re.e, the Heim + Handwerk and the Internationale Handwerksmesse. Important trade fairs include the ISPO, analytica, AUTOMATICA, BAU, and drinktec. Other exhibitions in Munich are EXPO REAL, IFAT, intersolar Europe, Laser World of Photonics, Transport Logistic, eCarTec and the yearly alternating productronica and electronica.

History
In 1908 the original Exhibition Park opened on the Theresienhöhe located behind the Ruhmeshalle; the fair moved at the end of 1998 to the new center in Munich-Riem.

1972 Summer Olympics
In its former location, the Messegelände consisted of twenty buildings located in the greater Munich area. During the 1972 Summer Olympics, five of these venues served as host to the fencing, the fencing part of modern pentathlon, judo, weightlifting, and wrestling events. These were:
Fencing Hall 1: These two halls, 11 and 12, played host to the fencing competitions for these games. Hall 11 was used as an entrance for spectators while Hall 12 was a competition area. They hosted the fencing finals.
Fencing Hall 2: Hall 20 hosted the semifinals of the fencing competitions along with the fencing part of the modern pentathlon event for the 1972 Games.
Weightlifting Hall: Hall 7 hosted the weightlifting competitions during the 1972 Games.
Judo and Wrestline Hall: Hall 14, the only one that was newly built, hosted the judo and wrestling competitions.

References

External links 

 

Venues of the 1972 Summer Olympics
Indoor arenas in Germany
Olympic fencing venues
Olympic judo venues
Olympic modern pentathlon venues
Olympic weightlifting venues
Olympic wrestling venues
Sports venues in Munich
Fairgrounds
Convention centres in Germany
Companies based in Munich
Event management companies of Germany
Sports venues completed in 1964
Business services companies established in 1964
1964 establishments in West Germany